Maharagama Divisional Secretariat is a  Divisional Secretariat  of Colombo District, of Western Province, Sri Lanka.

History

The current administrative complex was opened by President Mahinda Rajapaksa in 2010.

Divisions

The Divisional Secretariat consists of 41 Grama Niladhari Divisions.

Land Usage

The Maharagama Divisional Secretariat has  of land:

References

Divisional Secretariats of Colombo District
Colombo District